Robert "Bo" Goldman (born September 10, 1932) is an American screenwriter and playwright. He has received two Academy Awards for his screenplays of One Flew Over the Cuckoo's Nest (1975) and Melvin and Howard (1980).

Early life and education
Goldman was born into a Jewish family in New York City, the son of Lillian (Levy), a hat model, and Julian Goldman. Goldman's father was a Broadway producer, and owned a chain of well known eastern department stores called The Goldman Stores, and as an early pioneer of "time payments", his business thrived. Franklin Delano Roosevelt was a close friend and also his attorney. Goldman Store ads typically featured men in business suits and fashionably dressed women in furs. While this was an old strategy for appealing to those with dreams of upper-class status, the ad copy explicitly addressed middle-income customers. "He makes only $3,000 a year," blazoned one Goldman ad, "But is worth $112,290!" Julian loved the theatre, and was an "angel" or backer, to many Broadway Shows and reviews. His young son, Robert "Bo," accompanied Julian to an average of two shows a week. This influenced what the boy would choose to do later in life, convinced from an early age that he was meant to work in the theatre. In 1939 Julian was looking for a school where he could send his son. Eleanor Roosevelt admired the work of Helen Parkhurst and was in the midst of expanding the population and resources of the Dalton School by promoting a merger between the Todhunter School for girls (founded by Winifred Todhunter). Julian Goldman became an early backer, and it was this school where Bo would begin his education. He followed this by skipping his last year at Dalton in favor of fast tracking through Phillips Exeter Academy, an experience that informed a script he would write years later, Scent of a Woman.

Goldman is not related to William Goldman, another two-time-Oscar-winning screenwriter who won the Academy Award for All the President's Men the year after Bo won for One Flew Over the Cuckoo's Nest.

He attended  Princeton University where he wrote, produced, composed lyrics and was president of the famed Princeton Triangle Club, a proving ground for F. Scott Fitzgerald, James Stewart and director Joshua Logan. His 1953 production, Ham 'n Legs,  was presented on The Ed Sullivan Show – the first Triangle production ever to appear on National Television.

Military service
Upon graduation from Princeton, Goldman had a three-year stint in the U.S. Army stationed on Enewetak as personnel sergeant, an atoll in the Marshall Islands of the central Pacific Ocean used for nuclear bomb testing.

Early career

Broadway
After leaving the service Goldman found work on Broadway as the lyricist for First Impressions, a musical based on Jane Austen's Pride and Prejudice. Produced by composer Jule Styne, directed by Abe Burrows, and starring Hermione Gingold, Polly Bergen and Farley Granger, the play received decent reviews but had a very short run. He would spend the next few years unsuccessfully trying to get his second show, Hurrah Boys Hurrah, produced.

Television
Now married, and with 4 small children at home, he soon found a steady income working in the new world of live television at CBS. Goldman was mentored by Fred Coe (the "D.W. Griffith of dramatic television") and became part of the twilight of The Golden Age, associate producing and script editing Coe's prestigious Playhouse 90'''s, Days of Wine and Roses directed by a young John Frankenheimer, The Plot To Kill Stalin starring Eli Wallach, and Horton Foote's Old Man. Goldman went on to himself produce and write for public television on the award-winning NET Playhouse. After working together at NET Burt Lancaster encouraged Goldman to try his hand at screenwriting, which resulted in an early version of Shoot the Moon. The script became Goldman's calling card, and he would soon be "known for some of the best screenplays of the 1970s and 80s".

Personal life
One of his daughters was Amy Reed Goldman, who got a Ph.D. in comparative literature in the University of California Davis and is currently a senior lecturer at NYU Shanghai.

Goldman lives near Rockland, Maine with his daughter, Serena, and son-in-law, filmmaker Todd Field.

Film work

One Flew Over the Cuckoo's Nest

After reading Shoot the Moon, Miloš Forman asked Goldman to write the screenplay for One Flew Over the Cuckoo's Nest. The film won all five top Academy Awards including an Academy Award for Best Adapted Screenplay for Goldman. This was the first film to win the top five awards since Frank Capra's It Happened One Night in 1934. For his work on the film Goldman also received the Writers Guild Award and the Golden Globe Award.

The Rose and Melvin and Howard

He next wrote The Rose (1979), which was nominated for four Academy Awards. This was followed by his original screenplay Melvin and Howard (1980) which garnered Goldman his second Oscar, second Writers Guild Award, and the New York Film Critics Circle Award for Screenplay of the Year.

Shoot the Moon

Goldman's calling card, Shoot the Moon, was then filmed by Alan Parker and starred Diane Keaton and Albert Finney. The film received international acclaim and was embraced by some of America's most respected film critics:

However, due to a previous agreement Warren Beatty had negotiated with MGM the studio was bound that no film could be released with Diane Keaton in the same year as Beatty's Reds. Consequently, Shoot the Moon was effectively dumped – and subsequently released with little or no fanfare the following February – long after the fourth quarter "awards season." Nonetheless, Goldman's peers remembered and the following year he earned his third Writers Guild Award nomination. Shoot the Moon received international acclaim and was embraced by America's most respected film critics:

Pauline Kael – The New Yorker:

David Denby – New York Magazine:

David Edelstein – The New York Post:

However, due to the poor domestic release in the years before video, the film was all but forgotten until Warner Bros. acquired MGM's home video library and released the DVD in the summer of 2007. To this day Shoot the Moon has a perfect 100% score on the critic site Rotten Tomatoes.

For the next few years, Goldman contributed uncredited work to many scripts including Miloš Forman's Ragtime (1981) starring James Cagney and Donald O'Connor, The Flamingo Kid (1984) starring Matt Dillon, and Warren Beatty's Dick Tracy (1990).

Scent of a Woman 

He followed this with Scent of a Woman (1992) receiving his second Golden Globe Award and third Academy Award nomination. In the film Al Pacino plays Frank Slade, a blind, retired army colonel—a character Goldman said he based on someone he "knew from his days in the army." After being nominated seven times for roles as varied as Michael Corleone in Francis Ford Coppola's The Godfather and Frank Serpico in Sidney Lumet's Serpico, his portrayal of Frank Slade finally earned him the Academy Award for Best Actor. The film was beloved by critics who along with Pacino's performance singled out Goldman's screenplay:

Janet Maslin – The New York Times:

Roger Ebert – Chicago Sun-Times:

The film has an 88% score on the critic site Rotten Tomatoes.

 City Hall

Next up was Harold Becker's City Hall (1996) again starring Al Pacino and also John Cusack. Pacino played the corrupt Mayor of New York City. The film is peppered with musical theatre references – a clear homage to Goldman's father and his own Broadway days.

Meet Joe Black

After this was Meet Joe Black (1998) starring Brad Pitt and Anthony Hopkins. Critics gave the film mixed reviews. Pitt and the director, Martin Brest, took the biggest thumping. The main complaint centered not on content, but pace. Kenneth Turan of the Los Angeles Times wrote, "Where Meet Joe Black runs into most of its trouble is that everything happens so terribly slowly. Martin Brest has felt the need to inflate the tale until it floats around like one of those ungainly balloons in Macy's Thanksgiving Day Parade. Not helping the time go faster is the way star Brad Pitt has ended up playing Death. Ordinarily the most charismatic of actors, with an eye-candy smile and a winning ease, Pitt approaches this role largely on a leash, hanging around more like the protagonist of I Walked With a Zombie than a flesh-and-blood leading man."

The Perfect Storm

In 2000, Goldman did a page one uncredited rewrite of The Perfect Storm. It was his script that green lit the movie at Warner Bros. and convinced George Clooney to star. The film went on to earn $329,000,000.

In recent years, Goldman was rumored to be working on an adaptation of Jules Dassin's Du rififi chez les hommes for Al Pacino.

Influence
In a 1998 interview with The New York Times screenwriter Eric Roth said, "The great Bo Goldman. He's the pre-eminent screenwriter -- in my mind as good as it gets. He has the most varied and intelligent credits, from Cuckoo's Nest to Shoot the Moon, the best divorce movie ever made, to Scent of a Woman, to the great satire Melvin and Howard. He rarely makes mistakes, and he manages to maintain a distinctive American voice. And he manages to stay timely."

Roth once again expressed his admiration for Goldman in an October 2017 New York Magazine article titled "The 100 Best Screenwriters of All Time''." Here Roth writes, "The man whose work made the biggest impression on me, because of his audacious originality, his understanding of social mores, his ironic sense of humor, and his outright anger at being human, and all with his soft spoken grace and eloquent simplicity is Bo Goldman. This degenerate horse player of a man lived his life like he lived his politics, never shying from a fight. His words were silk, never wasted or misplaced, and he would throw away what others would consider glorious and did it all without a moment’s fanfare.”

Filmography

Films

Television

Awards

|-
! colspan="3" style="background: #DAA520;" | Academy Awards
|-

|-
! colspan="3" style="background: #DAA520;" | Golden Globes
|-

|-
! colspan="3" style="background: #DAA520;" | Writers Guild of America Awards
|-

|-
! colspan="3" style="background: #DAA520;" | New York Film Critics Circle Awards
|-

|-
! colspan="3" style="background: #DAA520;" | National Society of Film Critics Awards
|-

|-
! colspan="3" style="background: #DAA520;" | Boston Society of Film Critics
|-

|-
! colspan="3" style="background: #DAA520;" | Writers Guild of America Awards
|-

|-
! colspan="3" style="background: #DAA520;" | Academy Awards
|-

|-
! colspan="3" style="background: #DAA520;" | Golden Globes
|-

|-
! colspan="3" style="background: #DAA520;" | Writers Guild of America
|-

References

External links

 
Interview with Goldman – 17 February 2008

1932 births
Living people
American male screenwriters
Jewish American screenwriters
Best Adapted Screenplay Academy Award winners
Best Original Screenplay Academy Award winners
Princeton University alumni
Best Screenplay Golden Globe winners
Writers from New York City
Screenwriters from New York (state)
21st-century American Jews
Phillips Exeter Academy alumni